The  is the 6th edition of the Japan Film Professional Awards. It awarded the best of 1996 in film. The ceremony took place on April 12, 1997, at Theatre Shinjuku in Tokyo.

Awards 
Best Film: Helpless
Best Director: Takeshi Kitano (Kids Return)
Best Actress: Maiko Kawakami (Debeso)
Best Actor: Tadanobu Asano (Helpless, Focus)
Best New Director: Shinji Aoyama (Helpless, Chinpira)
Special: Tatsuoki Hosono (Shabu Gokudō)
Best Distinguished Service: Tomorowo Taguchi (Midori, Dangan Runner)
Best Distinguished Service: Mai Kitajima (Gonin2)

10 best films
 Helpless (Shinji Aoyama)
 Kids Return (Takeshi Kitano)
 Young Thugs: Innocent Blood (Kazuyuki Izutsu)
 Shabu Gokudō (Tatsuoki Hosono)
 Don't Look Up (Hideo Nakata)
 Okaeri (Makoto Shinozaki)
 Romance (Shunichi Nagasaki)
 Gonin2 (Takashi Ishii)

References

External links
  

Japan Film Professional Awards
1997 in Japanese cinema
Japan Film Professional Awards
April 1997 events in Asia